More  is a 2017 Turkish drama film directed by Onur Saylak. The film stars Ahmet Mumtaz Taylan, Hayat Van Eck and Tuba Buyukustun in the lead roles. The film is based on the novel of the same name by writer Hakan Günday. The film was written by Doğu Yaşar Akal together with Onur Saylak and Hakan Günday. The film was shot in Antalya and premiered on 3 July 2017 as part of the 52nd Karlovy Vary International Film Festival. The film was released in Turkey on January 12, 2018.

Plot 
Gaza is a teenager who is only 14 years old. Gaza, who lives with his father in a small coastal town, wants to leave this place behind and continue his education in the big city. However, his father makes Gaza part of a human trafficking network by putting him in a world very different from his dreams, which he had dreamed of. Gaza is also a human trafficker now. Gaza, where her father forced her to spy on immigrants, has two options. Either he will make a life in this dark world, which, like his father, is full of these crimes, or he himself will become an immigrant.

Awards and nominations

References

External links 

 

2017 drama films
Best Picture Golden Boll Award winners
Arabic-language films
Turkish drama films